The Populated Centers of Peru, are the fourth-level administrative subdivisions of the country. They are subdivisions of the districts, which in turn are subdivisions of provinces, which in turn are subdivisions of the regions.

See also
 Districts of Peru
 Provinces of Peru
 Regions of Peru

References
  Banco de Información Distrital from the National Informatics and Statistics Institute INEI. Retrieved May 25, 2008.

Subdivisions of Peru